Tritoxa is a genus of picture-winged flies in the family Ulidiidae.

Species
Tritoxa californica Sinclair, MacLeod & Wheeler, 2021
Tritoxa cuneata Loew, 1873
Tritoxa decipiens Sinclair, MacLeod & Wheeler, 2021
Tritoxa flexa (Wiedemann, 1830)
Tritoxa incurva Loew, 1873
Tritoxa pollinosa Cole, 1919
Tritoxa ra Harriot, 1942

References

Ulidiidae
Brachycera genera
Taxa named by Hermann Loew
Diptera of North America